Novum (Latin for new thing) is a term used by science fiction scholar Darko Suvin and others to describe the scientifically plausible innovations used by science fiction narratives.

Origin

Suvin learned the term from Ernst Bloch, whose work is cited frequently in Metamorphoses of Science Fiction.

Suvin argues that the genre of science fiction is distinguished from fantasy by the story being driven by a novum validated by logic he calls cognitive estrangement. This means that the hypothetical "new thing" which the story is about can be imagined to exist by scientific means rather than by magic, i.e., by the factual reporting of fictions and by relating them in a plausible way to reality.

References
Cambridge Companion to Science Fiction
Metamorphoses of Science Fiction: On the Poetics and History of a Literary Genre by Darko Suvin. 1979.

Science fiction studies